USS Banshee is a name used more than once by the U.S. Navy:

 , a gunboat commissioned 14 June 1864.
 , a tanker which served in both World War I and World War II.

References 
 

United States Navy ship names